Hericium coralloides is a saprotrophic fungus, commonly known as the coral tooth fungus. It grows on dead hardwood trees. The species is edible and good when young, but as it ages the branches and hanging spines become brittle and turn a light shade of yellowish brown.    

Found September 23, 1997 in Vilas County, Wisconsin near water, high in the wound of a living tree. The dried specimen lives at the UWSP Herbarium.

References

Edible fungi
Fungal plant pathogens and diseases
Fungi described in 1772
Russulales
Fungi of Europe